Brainerd is a masculine given name which may refer to:

 Brainerd Currie (1912–1965), a law professor
 D. Brainerd Holmes (1921–2013), American engineer and business executive, president of Raytheon
 Brainerd Jones (1865–1949), American architect
 Brainerd Kellogg (1834–1920), American professor of rhetoric and English literature
 C. Brainerd Metheny (1889–1960), American football and basketball coach, college athletics administrator and insurance executive

English-language masculine given names